Events from the year 1459 in France

Incumbents
 Monarch – Charles VII

Death
 Unknown – Jacques Morel, sculptor (born 1395)

References

1450s in France